is a Japanese tokusatsu television drama, the 47th installment in Toei Company's long-running Super Sentai series and the fourth produced in the Reiwa era. This series is the first in the franchise where all of the main characters have an insect motif.

The series premiered on March 5, 2023, joining Kamen Rider Geats in the Super Hero Time lineup on TV Asahi following the finale of Avataro Sentai Donbrothers.

Plot

2000 years ago, five heroes fought and defeated the Underground Empire Bugnarak, armed with the power of giant mechanical deities called the Shugods that form the giant mecha King-Ohger. After the battle, the heroes took their separate ways and five kingdoms were founded by each one of them: Shugoddam, Nkosopa, Ishabana, Gokkan, and Toufu.

In the present time, following a prophecy that states that Bugnarak would soon return and attempt to conquer the world again, the rulers of the five kingdoms gather their forces to prepare for the invasion, but the king of Shugoddam, Racles Hastie, decides to take advantage of the situation and plans to invade the other kingdoms, at the expense of the safety of his own subjects, but Gira, an orphan from Shugoddam, defies Racles for his treachery and steals his Ohger Calibur, the symbol of his authority and gains control of its powers. Branded as a traitor for challenging his king, Gira meets and joins forces with the rulers of the other kingdoms: Yanma Gust, president of Nkosopa, Himeno Ran, queen of Ishabana, Rita Kaniska, monarch of Gokkan and Kaguragi Dybowski, lord of Toufu, fighting together to save the world from Bugnarak's army and stop Racles' ambitions.

Production
The Ohsama Sentai King-Ohger trademark was registered by Toei on September 21, 2022, and published on September 30, 2022.

King-Ohger was officially announced on December 21, 2022. An online production announcement conference introducing the main cast and characters and the artist for the show's theme song was held on February 14, 2023.

Episodes

Cast
: 
: 
: 
: 
: 
: 
: 
: 
: 
: 
: 
: 
: 
: 
: 
: 
: 
: 
Ohger Calibur Voice:

Theme song

Composition & Arrangement: 
Lyrics & Artist:

Notes

References

External links
 at TV Asahi 
 at Toei Company 

Japanese fantasy television series
Super Sentai
2023 Japanese television series debuts
TV Asahi original programming
Television series about insects